Sorry, Wrong Number is a 1948 American thriller film noir directed by Anatole Litvak, from a screenplay by Lucille Fletcher, based on her 1943 radio play of the same name. The film stars Barbara Stanwyck and Burt Lancaster. It follows a bedridden woman, who overhears the plot of murder. While on the telephone, she attempts to help her husband solve the mystery and prevent the crime. Stanwyck was nominated for the Academy Award for Best Actress. It is one of the few pre-1950 Paramount Pictures films which remained in the studio's library (the rest are currently owned by NBCUniversal).

Radio play
Lucille Fletcher's play originally aired on the Suspense radio program on May 25, 1943, essentially a one-woman show with Agnes Moorehead as Mrs. Stevenson.

Plot

Mrs. Stevenson, an imperious invalid, accidentally intercepts a phone call between two men plotting a murder for that evening. She tries to enlist the help of the telephone operator, the police, and a hospital, becoming more frantic as the time passes. In the final moments of the play, she realizes that she herself is the intended victim.

Broadcast history

The play was rebroadcast seven times, on August 21 of the same year and again in 1944, 1945, 1948, 1952, 1957 and 1960. The final broadcast was on February 14, 1960. Orson Welles called Sorry, Wrong Number "the greatest single radio script ever written". In 2015, the broadcast was deemed "culturally, historically, or aesthetically significant" by the Library of Congress and selected for inclusion in the National Recording Registry.

Plot
Leona Stevenson is a spoiled, bedridden daughter of wealthy businessman James Cotterell. She tries to reach her husband, Henry. The servants are absent and she is alone in the apartment. She overhears two men planning a murder on a crossed telephone connection. The call cuts off without Leona learning much other than it is scheduled for the night. She fails to call the telephone company and the police for a few details.

While finding Henry, Leona recalls her past. She learns that the secretary met Henry that day with an attractive woman named Sally Lord and did not return to the office. Leona recognizes the woman as Sally Hunt, a college friend in love with Henry, and at the time was poor and working in a drug store. Leona took Henry from Sally, and married him against her father's wish. Sally later married Fred Lord, a lawyer in the district attorney's office. From overheard conversations, she learns her husband was close to resolving an investigation about Henry somehow. Sally is concerned she follows her husband and two associates to a mysterious meeting at an abandoned house on Staten Island. The house sign is owned by Waldo Evans, a chemist working for Leona's father. Sally arranged to meet Henry after warning him. He received a phone call, left the table and did not return. Sally concludes that the house was destroyed, Morano has been arrested by the police, and Waldo escaped them.

Leona receives a message from Henry, stating he left the town for work he had forgotten about and he will return on Sunday. Leona calls Dr. Phillip Alexander, the specialist she came to New York to see regarding her lifelong heart troubles. Alexander reveals that he gave Henry her prognosis ten days ago, something that Henry kept from her. In a flashback, Leona had gone some years without any cardiac episodes, before marrying Henry. Henry learns about her health issues for a few years, when she suffered a cardiac arrest during a quarrel. It becomes clear Leona tries to use Henry, insisting he worked for her father even though he is bored. As their troubles become severe, Leona's attacks become frequent, until she is bedridden. However, Alexander diagnoses the problems as purely psychosomatic; nothing is wrong with her physically, but he thinks she needs psychiatric help.

Leona calls Waldo. He reluctantly discloses that Henry recruited him to steal chemicals from the Cotterell drug company and sell them for Morano. Henry tried to bypass Morano when Waldo was transferred. However, Morano and his thugs tricked Henry into signing an IOU for $200,000 for a lost profit in three months. When Henry protested he had insufficient money, Morano pointed out that Leona has a large insurance policy. With Morano in custody, Waldo stresses that Henry no longer needs to raise the sum. He gives Leona a number to reach Henry, but when she calls and discovers that it is for the city morgue. The distraught Leona calls a nurse at the hospital. A frantic Henry calls Leona from a telephone booth. She hears an unnamed intruder sneaking inside the house, and tells Henry that she is the victim of the murder plot. Henry tells Leona to leave the house, but she is killed by the intruder and the phoneline goes off. As the police arrest Henry, he re-dials the phone, only for the killer to pick it up and send a reply to him.

Cast

Production
Sorry, Wrong Number conforms to many of the conventions of film noir. The film plays in real time with many flashbacks, and adds more characters and backstories. The bedroom window overlooks the night skyline of Manhattan. The film is shot very dark, with looming shadows and a circling camera used to maintain a high level of suspense. Hollywood's Production Code Administration initially objected to elements of Fletcher's screenplay, including its depiction of drug trafficking, and the script was significantly revised to win approval.

Reception
Variety listed the film as one of the Top Grossers of the year, earning $2,850,000 in the domestic market alone. Although not as well received as the radio play, with some critics noting the plot is too padded out, the movie adaptation is considered a classic of the film noir genre. Its twist ending is often cited as one of the era's most memorable. Stanwyck's performance was highly acclaimed, and garnered her a fourth Academy Award nomination for Best Actress. On Rotten Tomatoes the film has a score of 86%.

Adaptations
 A one-hour radio adaptation of the film was broadcast January 9, 1950, on Lux Radio Theatre. Stanwyck and Lancaster recreated their screen roles.
 Sorry, Wrong Number was made into a television play broadcast on station WCBW-TV (now WCBS-TV) in New York on January 30, 1946, starring Mildred Natwick. 
 A second live teleplay was broadcast on November 4, 1954, as the fourth episode of the CBS anthology series Climax!, starring Shelley Winters and adapted by Fletcher herself, with music provided by Fletcher's former husband, Bernard Herrmann.
 A version was produced for Australian television in 1958 starring Georgie Sterling. Sterling had performed in the play on radio in 1948. 
 A television film aired in 1989, starring Loni Anderson, Patrick Macnee and Hal Holbrook. It was directed by Tony Wharmby and adapted by Ann Louise Bardach.

Parody
On October 17, 1948, Stanwyck did a parody of Sorry, Wrong Number on The Jack Benny Program.

Other media
Clips from Sorry, Wrong Number were used for the 1982 comedy-mystery Dead Men Don't Wear Plaid, the 1991 thriller Dead Again and the 2014 action-thriller Jack Ryan: Shadow Recruit.

See also
 List of films featuring home invasions

References

External links

Streaming audio
 Sorry, Wrong Number East Coast Broadcast on Suspense: May 25, 1943, starring Agnes Moorehead.
 Sorry, Wrong Number West Coast Broadcast on Suspense: May 25, 1943, starring Agnes Moorehead.
Sorry, Wrong Number on Suspense: August 8, 1943, starring Agnes Moorehead.
 Sorry, Wrong Number on Suspense: September 6, 1945, starring Agnes Moorehead, broadcast to coincide with the release of the film.
 Sorry, Wrong Number on Lux Radio Theatre: January 9, 1950. Starring Barbara Stanwyck and Burt Lancaster.
Sorry, Wrong Number on Suspense: February 14, 1960, starring Agnes Moorehead in the final radio broadcast of the play.

1943 plays
1946 television plays
1948 films
1940s English-language films
1940s psychological thriller films
American black-and-white films
American psychological thriller films
Film noir
Films about murder
Films based on radio series
Films directed by Anatole Litvak
Films produced by Hal B. Wallis
Films scored by Franz Waxman
Films set in Manhattan
Films set in New York City
Paramount Pictures films
Films about telephony
United States National Recording Registry recordings
1940s American films